Lobulogobius omanensis, the Oman goby, is a species of goby found in the Indo-West Pacific.

Size

References

Gobiidae
Taxa named by Frederik Petrus Koumans
Fish described in 1944